is a 1992 Japanese kaiju film directed by Takao Okawara, written by Kazuki Ōmori, and produced by Shogo Tomiyama. Produced and distributed by Toho Studios, it is the 19th film in the Godzilla franchise, and is the fourth film in the franchise's Heisei era. The film features the fictional monster characters Godzilla, Mothra, and Battra, and stars  Tetsuya Bessho, Satomi Kobayashi, Takehiro Murata, Megumi Odaka, Shiori Yonezawa, Makoto Otake, Akiji Kobayashi, Koichi Ueda, Shinya Owada, Keiko Imamura, Sayaka Osawa, Saburo Shinoda and Akira Takarada, with Kenpachiro Satsuma as Godzilla. The plot follows Battra and Mothra's attempts to stop Godzilla from attacking Yokohama.

Originally conceived as a standalone Mothra film entitled Mothra vs. Bagan, the film is notable for its return to a more fantasy-based, family-oriented atmosphere, evocative of older Godzilla films. Although he did not return as director, Ōmori continued his trend of incorporating Hollywood elements into his screenplay, in this case nods to the Indiana Jones franchise.

Godzilla vs. Mothra was released theatrically in Japan on December 12, 1992, and was followed by Godzilla vs. Mechagodzilla II the following year. Godzilla vs. Mothra was released direct-to-video in the United States in 1998 by Columbia Tristar Home Video under the title Godzilla and Mothra: The Battle for Earth. The film was the second highest-grossing film in Japan in 1993, with Jurassic Park being the highest-grossing.

Plot

In mid-1992, following the events of Godzilla vs. King Ghidorah, a meteoroid crashes in the Ogasawara Trench and awakens Godzilla. Six months later, explorer Takuya Fujito is detained after stealing an ancient artifact. Later, a representative of the Japanese Prime Minister offers to have Takuya's charges dropped if he explores Infant Island with his ex-wife, Masako Tezuka and Kenji Ando, the secretary of the rapacious Marutomo company. After the trio arrives on the island, they find a cave containing a depiction of two giant insects in battle. Further exploration leads them to a giant egg and a pair of diminutive humanoids called the Cosmos, who identify the egg as belonging to Mothra.

The Cosmos tell of an ancient civilization that tried to control the Earth's climate 12,000 years ago, thus provoking the Earth into creating Battra. Battra, a male divine moth similar to Mothra, but much more fearsome in appearance, destroyed the civilisation and their weather-controlling device but then became uncontrollable, and started to harm the very planet that created him. Mothra was then sent by the Earth to fight Battra, who eventually lost. The Cosmos explain how the meteoroid uncovered Mothra's egg, and may have awoken Battra, who is still embittered over humanity's interference in the Earth's natural order.

The Marutomo company sends a freighter to Infant Island to pick up the egg, ostensibly to protect it. As they are sailing, Godzilla surfaces and heads toward the newly hatched Mothra larva. Battra, also as a larva, soon appears and joins the fight, allowing Mothra to retreat. The battle between Godzilla and Battra is eventually taken underwater, where the force of the battle causes a giant crack on the Philippine Sea Plate that swallows the two.

Masako and Takuya later discover Ando's true intentions when he kidnaps the Cosmos and takes them to Marutomo headquarters, where the CEO intends to use them for publicity purposes. Mothra enters Tokyo in an attempt to rescue the Cosmos, but is attacked by the JSDF. The wounded Mothra heads for the National Diet Building and starts constructing a cocoon around herself. Meanwhile, Godzilla surfaces from Mount Fuji, while Battra frees himself from the Earth's crust and continues towards Japan.

Both Mothra and Battra attain their imago forms and converge at Yokohama Cosmo World where they begin to fight once more. Godzilla interrupts the battle and initially attacks Battra. Mothra then briefly incapacitates Godzilla and comes to Battra's aid before returning to battle with Godzilla. Battra then returns the favor coming to Mothra's defense. Regrouping, the two moths decide to join forces against Godzilla, determining him to be the greater threat to the planet. Eventually, Mothra and Battra overwhelm Godzilla and carry it over the ocean. Godzilla bites Battra's neck and fires its atomic breath into the wound, killing him. A tired Mothra drops Godzilla and the lifeless Battra into the water below, sealing Godzilla below the surface by creating a mystical glyph with scales from her wings. The next morning, the Cosmos explain that Battra had been waiting many years to destroy an even larger asteroid that would threaten the Earth in 1999. Mothra had promised she would stop the future collision if Battra were to die, and she and the Cosmos leave Earth as the humans bid farewell.

Cast

Production
The idea of shooting a movie featuring a revamped Mothra dated back to a screenplay written in 1990 by Kazuki Omori entitled Mothra vs. Bagan, which revolved around a vengeful dragon called Bagan who sought to destroy humanity for its abuse of the Earth's resources, only to be defeated by Mothra, the goddess of peace. However, following the poor box office performance of Godzilla vs. Biollante, the project was ultimately scrapped by Toho, under the assumption that Mothra was a character born purely out of Japanese culture, and thus would have been difficult to market overseas unlike the more internationally recognized Godzilla.

After the success of Godzilla vs. King Ghidorah, producer Shōgo Tomiyama and Godzilla series creator Tomoyuki Tanaka proposed resurrecting King Ghidorah in a film entitled Ghidorah's Counterattack, but relented when polls demonstrated that Mothra was more popular with women, who comprised the majority of Japan's population. Tomiyama replaced Ōmori with Takao Okawara as director, but maintained Ōmori as screenwriter. Hoping to maintain as much of Mothra vs. Bagan as possible, Ōmori reconceptualized Bagan as Badora, a dark twin to Mothra. The character was later renamed Battra (a portmanteau of "battle" and "Mothra"), as the first name was disharmonious in Japanese. Tomiyama had intended to feature Mothra star Frankie Sakai, but was unable to because of scheduling conflicts. The final battle between Godzilla, Mothra and Battra was originally meant to have a more elaborate conclusion; as in the final product, Godzilla would have been transported to sea, only to kill Battra and plunge into the ocean. However, the site of their fall would have been the submerged, Stonehenge-like ruins of the Cosmos civilization, which would have engulfed and trapped Godzilla with a forcefield activated by Mothra.

Ishirō Honda, who directed the first Godzilla film and many others, visited the set shortly before dying.

Special effects
Koichi Kawakita continued his theme of giving Godzilla's opponents the ability to metamorphose, and had initially intended to have Mothra killed off, only to be reborn as the cybernetic moth MechaMothra, though this was scrapped early in production, thus making Godzilla vs. Mothra the first post-1984 Godzilla movie to not feature a mecha contraption. The underwater scenes were filmed through an aquarium filled with fish set between the performers and the camera. Kawakita's team constructed a new Godzilla suit from previously used molds, though it was made slimmer than previous suits, the neck given more prominent ribbing, and the arrangement of the character's dorsal plates was changed so that the largest plate was placed on the middle of the back. The arms were more flexible at the biceps, and the face was given numerous cosmetic changes; the forehead was reduced and flattened, the teeth scaled down, and the eyes given a golden tint. The head was also electronically modified to allow more vertical mobility. Filming the Godzilla scenes was hampered when the suit previously used for Godzilla vs. Biollante and Godzilla vs. King Ghidorah, which was needed for some stunt-work, was stolen from Toho studios, only to be recovered at Lake Okutama in bad condition. The remains of the suit were recycled for the first battle sequence. Godzilla's roar was reverted to the high-pitched shriek from pre-1984 Godzilla films, while Battra's sound effects were recycled from those of Rodan. In designing Battra, which the script described as a "black Mothra", artist Shinji Nishikawa sought to distance its design from Mothra's by making its adult form more similar to its larval one than is the case with Mothra, and combining Mothra's two eyes into one.

Release
Godzilla vs. Mothra was released in Japan on December 12, 1992 where it was distributed by Toho. The film sold approximately 4,200,000 tickets in Japan, becoming the number one Japanese film on the domestic market in the period that included the year 1993. It earned ¥2.22 billion in distribution income, and grossed  in total.

The film was released in the United States as Godzilla and Mothra: The Battle for Earth on April 28, 1998 on home video by Columbia TriStar Home Video.

Critical reaction
Review aggregation website Rotten Tomatoes has a 75% approval rating from critics, based on 8 reviews with an average score of 6.3/10. Ed Godziszewski of Monster Zero said, "Rushed into production but a few months after Godzilla vs. King Ghidorah, this film is unable to hide its hurried nature [but] effects-wise, the film makes up for the story's shortcomings and then some." Japan Hero said, "While this movie is not the best of the Heisei series, it is still a really interesting movie. The battles are cool, and Battra was an interesting idea. If you have never seen this movie, I highly recommend it."

Stomp Tokyo said the film is "one of the better Godzilla movies in that the scenes in which monsters do not appear actually make some sort of sense. And for once, they are acted with some gusto, so that we as viewers can actually come to like the characters on screen, or at least be entertained by them." Mike Bogue of American Kaiju said the film "[does] not live up to its potential", but added that "[its] colorful and elaborate spectacle eventually won [him] over" and "the main story thread dealing with the eventual reconciliation of the divorced couple adequately holds the human plot together."

Home media
The film was released by Sony on Blu-ray in The Toho Godzilla Collection on May 6, 2014.

Awards

References

Bibliography

External links

Godzilla vs. Mothra on Wikizilla

1992 films
1990s Japanese-language films
1990s science fiction adventure films
1990s fantasy adventure films
1990s monster movies
Japanese fantasy adventure films
Japanese crossover films
Environmental films
Films about telepathy
Films directed by Takao Okawara
Films produced by Tomoyuki Tanaka
Films scored by Akira Ifukube
Films set in 1992
Films set in 1993
Films set in Tokyo
Films set in Nagoya
Films set in Yokohama
Films set in amusement parks
Films set in the Pacific Ocean
Films set on fictional islands
Giant monster films
Godzilla films
Japanese science fiction films
Japanese sequel films
Kaiju films
Mothra
TriStar Pictures films
Toho films
1990s Japanese films